Anders Georg Eriksson (born 3 August 1956) is a Swedish revue artist, comedian and actor. He is best known as a member of the comedy group Galenskaparna och After Shave. 
Actor and comedian Claes Eriksson is Anders Eriksson's older brother.

Biography 
Anders Eriksson studied the teacher's program at Chalmers in Gothenburg. He never finished the program and became instead a member of the i revue group Galenskaparna which was founded in 1978. In 1982 the group started collaborating with the vocal group After Shave. Their collaboration has resulted in numerous revues, films and TV Series, often with Eriksson in the lead role.

The role as Roy in the TV series Macken from 1986 made him very popular. Another of his most famous characters are Farbror Frej ("Uncle Frej") which first appeared in the TV series En himla många program from 1989. Other characters are the social Spanar'n in revues and in En himla många program, and the passionate music teacher Morgan in Den enskilde medborgaren ("The Individual Citizen").

In addition to the work with Galenskaparna och After Shave, Eriksson has appeared solo with his banjolele. He has sung and played at festivals both in Sweden and abroad. His role model is George Formby.

Stage performances 
1982 Skruven är lös
1983 Träsmak
1985 Cyklar
1987 Stinsen brinner (lead role)
1991 Grisen i säcken
1992 Skruven är lös
1993 Nått nytt?
1994 Resan som blev av
1994 Lyckad nedfrysning av herr Moro
1997 Alla ska bada
2000 Allt Möjligt
2000 Jul Jul Jul
2002 Kasinofeber (lead role)
2010 Gubbröra och Pyttipanna
2010 Hagmans Konditori

Filmography 
2006 Den enskilde medborgaren
2000 Gladpack
1998 Åke från Åstol
1996 Monopol
1993 Tornado
1992 Nordexpressen
1991 Stinsen brinner... filmen alltså (lead role)
1990 Macken (one of the lead roles)
1989 En himla många program
1989 Hajen som visste för mycket (lead role)
1987 Leif (lead role)
1986 The Castle Tour
1986 Macken (one of the lead roles)

References

External links
 

1956 births
Swedish male film actors
Swedish male stage actors
Swedish male television actors
Swedish male musical theatre actors
Swedish comedians
Galenskaparna och After Shave members
Living people
People from Trollhättan